Abdollahabad (also Romanized as ‘Abdollāhābād) is a village in Mokriyan-e Sharqi Rural District, in the Central District of Mahabad County, West Azerbaijan Province, Iran. At the 2006 census, its population was 258, in 39 families.

References 

Populated places in Mahabad County